The term Rajasthani Muslims is usually used to signify Muslims from the state of Rajasthan in the north-western part of India and speak Hindi, Urdu and Sindhi languages.

Indian Muslims like all other Muslims practice the basic tenets of Islam including Namaz and fasting in Ramazan. Rajasthani Muslims are also punctual of Ramazan and giving Zakat (charity given to poor) and going on the Hajj pilgrimage.

Spread of Islam in Rajasthan

The one of the first Muslim Sufi missionary Khawaja Moinuddin Chishti came to Rajasthan in 1222 CE and settled in Ajmer. Khawaja Moinuddin Chishti is also popularly known by his title "Ghareeb Nawaz" (friend of the poor). Khawaja Moinuddin Chishti is one of the most influential Sufi in India and is credited with spreading of Islam in the Indian subcontinent.

When Khawaja Moinuddin Chishti reached India, he found the local society to be poisoned by untouchability. So he decided to organize a langar (public eating of food together irrespective of status, sex, religion and caste). This langar brought people into influence of Islam and its strict stand against untouchability.

Khawaja Moinuddin Chishti is buried at the Dargah of Khawaaza Moiunddin Chisti which is his mausoleum (Roza Shareef) in Rajasthani city of Ajmer. The city where he preached Islam all his whole life.

Role of Muslims in society

Rajasthani Muslims are very prominent in industry and medium-sized businesses. Many members of this community migrated to Pakistan in 1947 and have settled in Sindh.

Demography of Muslims

According to the Indian census of 2011, there were 6,215,377 Muslims in Rajasthan, constituting 9.1% of the state's population.

Masjids

There are numerous masjids or mosques in Rajasthan:
 Adhai Din Ka Jhonpra mosque, Ajmer
 Raza Masjid, Basni, Nagaur
 Osmania Masjid, Bhilwara
 Sandali Masjid, Ajmer
 Kagzi Jama Masjid, Kagzi Colony, Jaipur
 Jama Masjid, Johari Bazaar, Jaipur
 Noor Masjid, Sodala, Jaipur
 Haizam Faroshan Masjid, Ashok Nagar, Jaipur
 Library Masjid, Jaipur
 Masjid-E-Gousia Nooriya (Badi Masjid, Savina, Udaipur)
 hussain masjid dholibawdi udaipur
 Shahi Jama Masjid, Tonk City.
 Jami Mosque (Ranthambhore Fort)
 Jami Mosque (Khandar Fort)
 Jami Mosque (Tonk)
 Jami Mosque (Malarna Doonger, Khohri, Behted)

Dargah/Roza

Rajasthan has numerous walis / Sufi saints.  The burial place of these saints are known as dargah or roza where Muslim masses pay visit and perform ziyarat by offering namaaz, reciting and reading Quran Shareef and offering fatiha.

Dargahs in Rajasthan include 
 Dargah khawaja Moinuddin Chishti (Garib Nawaz), Ajmer 
 Dargah khwaza Fakhruddin Chishti, Sarwar 
 Dargah Hisamuddin Chishti, Sambhar lake 
 Dargah Fakhruddin shareef, Galiyakot 
 Dargah Hazrat Diwan e Shah, Kapasan 
 Dargah Mastaan Shah Baba 
 Dargah Sheikh Mohammad Durvaish, Motidungri
 Dargah Gaiban Shah Pir, Jalore
 Dargah Abansa Dada sanchore (Jalore)
 Dargah dawalshah pir Surana (Jalore)
 Dargah Dantala Vali sivana, Badmer
 Dargah Amruddin Dada Gudamalani, Badmer
 Dargah MalikshH Pir, Jalore
 Dargah Malik Shah Datar Chitlwana, Jalore
 Dargah Mitu Panju Bhatala, Badmer
 Dargah Asaba Pir Sindhary, Badmer
 Dargah Haji Kadir Baba Saynji Ki Beri, Jalore
 Dargah Hazrat Ismail Macci Sahb, Malarna (SWM)
 Dargah Qattal Shah Pir (Bonli)
 Dargah Haqqani Baba Pir (Chan) SWM

See also
 Islam in India

References

Islam in India by location

Social groups of Rajasthan
Social groups of Pakistan